Ricky Rotch (born 8 September 1966) is a New Zealand cricketer. He played in one first-class match for Wellington in 1993/94.

See also
 List of Wellington representative cricketers

References

External links
 

1966 births
Living people
New Zealand cricketers
Wellington cricketers
Cricketers from Dunedin